Kfar Zoharim (lit. Village of Lights), officially Ramot Yehuda-Zoharim (lit. Judea Heights-Lights), is an educational Therapy Youth Village for youth from the ultra-orthodox community, between the ages of 14 – 18, who are unable to find their place in regular ultra-orthodox educational frameworks. the village was established by Israel Prize Laureate, Rabbi Yitzchak Dovid Grossman in 2012.  
 It falls under the jurisdiction of Mateh Yehuda Regional Council.

History
The village was first established in 1993 by Jerusalem residents who were former members of the Black Panthers. It was named after the singer Zohar Argov, a drug addict. Today it treats around 80 addicts.
The institution has failed to exist over the years and management has been transferred to a volunteer organization called Ramot Yehuda, which has received assistance from the National Authority for the War on Drugs. The name of the place is changed to "Ramot Yehuda-Zoharim". About 80 patients lived there, as part of a treatment that lasted a year and a half. There was also an emergency center in the village for the immediate treatment of life-threatening drug addicts, this institution existed until 2011 and ceased to exist due to budgetary distress. 
In 2011, she turned to Rabbi Yitzchak David Grossman, who agreed to rehabilitate the association while exchanging board members and raising donations to save the place, in order to turn it into a youth village for children from ultra-Orthodox homes who dropped out of educational framework.

References

shine ahead ,Israel Hayom, Emily Amarosi (2014)

External links
Kfar Zoharim Youth Village 

Villages in Israel
Populated places established in 1993
Drug and alcohol rehabilitation centers
Populated places in Jerusalem District
1993 establishments in Israel
Addiction organizations in Israel
Mizrahi Jewish culture in Israel